Ghinghinda is a rural locality in the Shire of Banana, Queensland, Australia.

Road infrastructure
The Leichhardt Highway runs through from north-east to south-east. The Taroom Bauhinia Downs Road (State Route 7) passes through the north-west corner.

References 

Shire of Banana
Localities in Queensland